The 1880 Kentucky Derby was the 6th running of the Kentucky Derby. The race took place on May 18, 1880.

Full results

Payout

The winner received a purse of $3,800.
Second place received $200.

References

Further reading

1880
Kentucky Derby
Derby
May 1880 sports events